, is a Japanese singer and actor as well as member of Hey! Say! JUMP. He is under the management of Johnny & Associates.

Early life 
Chinen is the son of Takashi Chinen, a former Japanese gymnast who won a bronze medal in the 1992 Summer Olympics. He is named after Yuri Osawa, an announcer, whose name his mother liked, but is written with different characters; the yu is a character often used in girl's names (侑 Yū) and the ri is taken from Li (李), a surname his mother thought common among Chinese gold medalist gymnasts.

Career 
On June 2, 2003, Chinen entered Johnny & Associates as a trainee. Daiki Arioka, who would later also debut as a member of Hey! Say! JUMP, was also there during that time. On April 3, 2007, he began activities with the temporary group, Hey! Say! 7 starting with a public performance at a KAT-TUN concert.

On September 21, 2007, he made his debut as a member of Hey! Say! JUMP.

He was in a 2008 drama, One-Pound Gospel, as "Yoshihiko" in Episode 3, with Hey! Say! JUMP member Ryosuke Yamada and their senpai, Kazuya Kamenashi (KAT-TUN). In the same year, he played in the drama Sensei wa erai! as Umeno Wataru, along with other Hey! Say! JUMP members: Daiki Arioka, Ryosuke Yamada and Yuto Nakajima. In October 2008, he was in the drama called Scrap Teacher: Kyoshi Saisei as Yoshida Eitaro, along with the same Hey! Say! JUMP members that played with him in Sensei wa erai!.

As a supporter of the Japanese volleyball team for the FIVB World Grand Prix 2009, he performed in June 2009 with Ryosuke Yamada and Nakayama Yuma w/ B.I.Shadow, which is composed of Kento Nakajima, Kikuchi Fuma, Hokuto Matsumura and Yugo Kochi as members of the temporary group NYC Boys. The "C" of NYC boys comes from the initials of his family name "Chinen".

On March 2, 2010, a press release made by Johnny and Associates revealed that Chinen and Yamada would become members of a second Johnny's unit, NYC. They worked as a member of both Hey! Say! JUMP and NYC, which is a rarity in their talent agency. Ryo Nishikido (and formerly Uchi Hiroki) is the only such case of a Johnny's talent officially debuting in two groups (Kanjani8 and NEWS), and as NYC became an officially debuted Johnny's unit, Yamada and Chinen joined them in this unusual situation.

In September 2011, he played the voice of Brainy in the Japanese-dubbed version of the film The Smurfs. Hey! Say! JUMP's ninth single, "Magic Power", was used as the theme song for the film.

In January 2012, Chinen co-starred with his senpai Tomohisa Yamashita in a drama called Saiko no Jinsei no Owarikata: Ending Planner, in which he played Yamashita's younger brother. Chinen's character in the drama was a university student who was so focused on helping out a friend to the point of stealing money from his family's business. Atsuko Maeda and Nana Eikura joined the cast.

In June 2012, It was announced that Chinen would have his first lead-role drama series based on the manga Sprout, by Atsuko Nanba, on July 7 on NTV.

Filmography

Shows
 Merengue no Kimochi (with Ryosuke Yamada, NTV, October 11, 2008)
 Vainilla (with Ryosuke Yamada, August 15, 2009)
 VS Arashi (with Ryosuke Yamada, Fuji TV, August 15, 2009)
 Dasshutsu Game Dero! (with Ryosuke Yamada, December 8, 2010)
For Hey! Say! 7 or Hey! Say! JUMP-related appearances, see Hey! Say! JUMP.

Dramas
 Yukan Club (NTV, 2007) as Ryota (Episode 2)
 1 Pound no Fukuin (NTV, 2008) as Yoshihiko (Episode 3)
 Sensei wa Erai! (NTV, 2008) as Umeno Wataru
 Scrap Teacher: Kyoushi Saisei (NTV, 2008) as Yoshida Eitaro
 Saikō no Jinsei no Owarikata: Ending Planner (TBS, 2012) as Hayato Ihara
 Sprout (NTV, 2012) as Narahashi Sōhei
 Yorozu Uranaidokoro Onmyōya e Yōkoso (Fuji TV, 2013) as Shunta Sawazaki
 Hissatsu Shigotonin 2014" (TV Asahi, 2014) as Ryū
 Jigoku Sensei Nube (NTV, 2014) as Kurita Makoto
 Hissatsu Shigotonin 2015 (TV Asahi, 2015) as Ryū
 Hissatsu shigotonin 2016 (9/25) as Ryu
 Hissatsu shigotonin 2018 as Ryu
 Atama Ni Kiitemo Aho To Wa Tatakauna 2019 as Kotaro Tanimura

Movies
 Nanako to Nanao (NHK, 2004) as Nanao
 Nin x Nin: The Ninja Star Hattori (Toho, August 28, 2004) as Kenichi Mitsuba
 Sword of the Stranger (opened September 29, 2007) as Kotaro (voice)
 The Smurfs (September 9, 2011) as Brainy (voice, Japanese-dubbed version)
 Samurai Hustle (2014)
 Samurai Hustle Returns (2016)
 Gold Medal Man (2016) as Akita Senichi
 Mumon: The Land of Stealth (2017) as Oda Nobukatsu
 Teen Bride (2017) as Isuzu Ebina
 Kids on the Slope (2018) as Kaoru Nishimi

Appearances
 Aiba Manabu
 Haneru no Tobira
 Hirunandesu
 Hyakushiki
 Hyakushiki Volleyball SP
 Itadaki High JUMP
 Little Tokyo Live
 Shounen Club
 School Kakumei! (April 2009–present, NTV)
 VS Arashi
 Yan Yan JUMP

Stage
 Playzone 2007: Change 2 Chance (performed with Shonentai, 2007) as Ken
 Johnny's World 2012
 Johnny's World Kanshasai 2013

Concerts
For Hey! Say! JUMP-related concerts and albums, see Hey! Say! JUMP.

Discography

Solos
 "On The Wind"
 "Kawaii Kimi no Koto da Mono"
 "Ookiku nare boku"
 "Love Parade" (originally Arashi's song)

Duets
 "Wish" with Akasaka Akira (Hikaru Genji) in Playzone 2007
 "Stars in Heaven" with Ryosuke Yamada (the song is also known as "Future Earth" or "Mirai no Chikyu ni Mukatte")
 "You & You" with Yuto Nakajima
 "Super Super Night" with Kota Yabu & Yuto Nakajima
 "Pet Shop Love Motion" with Yuya Takaki, Kei Inoo & Yuto Nakajima
 "Boku to Keito" with Keito Okamoto

Songs written
"Smile Song" 
 "Ookiku nare boku"
 "Boku to Keito" with Keito Okamoto written for DEAR Album

References

External links
 Hey! Say! JUMP
 Johnny's-net

1993 births
Living people
Hey! Say! JUMP members
Johnny & Associates
Musicians from Shizuoka Prefecture
Actors from Shizuoka Prefecture
21st-century Japanese singers
21st-century Japanese male singers
21st-century Japanese male actors
Japanese male pop singers
Japanese dance music singers
Japanese rhythm and blues singers
Japanese hip hop singers
Japanese male television actors
Japanese male film actors
Japanese idols
Japanese male child actors